Chris Kirchner is an American entrepreneur. He is the co-founder and former CEO of logistics company Slync.io.

Early life and education 

Kirchner was born in San Francisco, California and studied international marketing at Butler University before moving on to study communications at the University of Kentucky, leaving in 2009 before graduating.

Career 

After leaving the University of Kentucky, he started Kirchner Entertainment, an advertising and entertainment company. He later took positions with tech supplier Best Buy until 2015 and then Lexington-based Turner Labels, where he met Raj Patel while working with a Salesforce contact.

In 2017, Kirchner and Patel co-founded the logistics firm Slync.io, where Kirchner served as the company's CEO. Investors in the business included Goldman Sachs and Blumberg Capital, with funding rounds totaling $80m, valuing the company at $240m. 

In late 2021, Kirchner was also among several potential bidders for the then financially-troubled English association football club Derby County, publicly declaring his interest in November before withdrawing his bid on 24 December 2021. After a failed attempt to buy Championship rivals Preston North End, he renewed his interest in Derby County and was confirmed as preferred bidder on 6 April 2022. He again withdrew his bid for the club in June 2022. 

In July 2022, a Forbes investigation reported Kirchner had fired Slync.io executives after they raised questions about company funds; he was also facing a lawsuit for wrongful termination and claims of "fraudulent behavior". He was said to have told Slync.io's board that the business had generated close to $30 million in revenue in 2021, from about 20 customers, while the real figures were closer to $1 million from fewer than five customers. Kirchner was first suspended and then fired by Slync.io in August 2022 after making financial misrepresentations to the company board. 

In February 2023, Kirchner's home in Westlake, Texas was raided by the FBI, and he was charged with $20 million wire fraud for transferring company funds into his personal bank account while employed at Slync.io. The US Attorney for the Northern District of Texas alleged Kirchner had used the money to fund a "lavish lifestyle", including a $16m (£13.3m) private Gulfstream jet, a $495,000 (£410,000) luxury suite at a Dallas sports stadium, prestige cars including a Rolls-Royce, and membership of an exclusive Dallas-area golf club called the Vaquero.

References 

Living people
Year of birth missing (living people)
University of Kentucky alumni

Butler University alumni
American businesspeople